Katja Pehrman is a Finnish diplomat. She has been the Finnish OSCE Ambassador since 1 September 2013 and chaired by the Human Dimension Committee in 2016. She started working for the Ministry for Foreign Affairs in 2002.

Prior to the OSCE Ambassador, Pehrman served as Foreign Minister Erkki Tuomioja as diplomatic assistant and cabinet manager.

Previously, she has worked at the Ministry of Foreign Affairs' Political Department in various positions, including the Head of the Department and the Under Secretary of State.

Pehrman has worked, in particular, on security policy issues, including in the arms control unit.

In Finland's foreign missions, Pehrman has worked at the Finnish Permanent Representation to the United Nations in New York, for example Finland's EU Presidency, and has served in the Finnish Permanent Mission of the OSCE in Vienna during which he served as chairman of the OSCE's Budget and Management Committee during the Finnish OSCE Presidency.

References 

Permanent Representatives of Finland to the Organization for Security and Co-operation in Europe
Finnish women ambassadors
Finnish women diplomats